Megalenhydris barbaricina is a Late Pleistocene giant otter from Sardinia. It is known from a single skeleton, discovered in the Grotta di Ispinigoli near Dorgali, and was described in 1987. The species is one of four extinct otter species from Sardinia and Corsica. The others are Algarolutra majori, Lutra castiglionis and Sardolutra ichnusae.
This otter was large, possibly even larger than the extant Pteronura, which can reach two meters in length. The structure of the teeth points to a diet of shellfish and/or crustaceans. A special characteristic of the species is the flattening of the first few caudal vertebrae (the remainder of the caudal vertebrae are not known). This might point to a slightly flattened tail.

References

External links

Prehistoric monotypic mammal genera
Otters
Pleistocene carnivorans
Prehistoric mustelids
Pleistocene mammals of Europe
Fossil taxa described in 1987
Prehistoric carnivoran genera